Mike Mitchell (born October 18, 1970) is an American film director, writer, producer, actor and animator. He directed the films Deuce Bigalow: Male Gigolo, Surviving Christmas, Sky High, Shrek Forever After, Alvin and the Chipmunks: Chipwrecked, Trolls
and The Lego Movie 2: The Second Part.

Early life
Mitchell was born in Oklahoma City, Oklahoma, the son of lawyer and former chairman of the Oklahoma Pardon and Parole Board, Robert Mitchell and Julia Baker. According to his father, "Mitchell's gifts for artistic imagery were discovered early." He graduated from Putnam City North High School, and during this time was very much involved in the arts, then subsequently moved to Los Angeles to attend the California Institute of the Arts. During his time there, there was a demand for young animators, which led him into television.

Working for such filmmakers as Tim Burton and Spike Jonze, Mitchell became an illustrator. He has one older sister, Suzanne Mitchell Robertson.

Career
He started his career as director for Matt O'Callaghan's The Itsy Bitsy Spider. He first gained critical attention when he co-wrote, produced and directed the short film Herd, which won several film festival awards, including the Spirit of Slamdance Award at the 1999 Slamdance Festival. That same year, he made his feature film directorial debut with the comedy Deuce Bigalow: Male Gigolo, starring Rob Schneider. He worked for various companies including Disney, DreamWorks, MTV, Nickelodeon, Universal and Sony.

He directed the films Alvin and the Chipmunks: Chipwrecked, Surviving Christmas and Sky High. The first two received negative reviews, while the third has received positive reviews. In 2006, he joined DreamWorks Animation, and was a story artist for Shrek the Third and Creative Consultant for Kung Fu Panda. He later directed the movie Shrek Forever After and voiced the character Butterpants.

Mitchell's short film Frannie's Christmas was preserved by the Academy Film Archive in 2012.

He also worked as a voice actor for Advisor Wedgie (known as “Nerd” for most of the film) in Monsters vs. Aliens, and Andy “Jack” Beanstalk in Puss in Boots. He also directed live action sequences on The SpongeBob Movie: Sponge Out of Water. He not only works on movies but in television as well. He directed and wrote several episodes of SpongeBob SquarePants. Mitchell also directed the animated film The Lego Movie 2: The Second Part, which was released on February 8, 2019, to positive reviews. Mitchell will also direct Nightcrawlers, a supernatural action comedy, a sequel to Sky High, a live-action-animated adaptation of the book We're Not From Here, and a live-action/animated adaptation of the song Puff, the Magic Dragon.

Awards
Sundance Film Festival: "Frannie's Christmas" (1993).

Aspen Shortsfest 
1999: Won special recognition for "Herd" (1999).

Atlanta Film Festival
1999: Won Honorable Mention for Best Narrative Short: "Herd" (1999).

Birmingham Sidewalk Moving Picture Festival
1999: Won first prize for "Herd" (1999).

Slamdance Film Festival
1999: Won Spirt of Slamdance Award for "Herd" (1999).

HI Mom Film Festival
2000: Won first prize for "Herd" (1999).

Movieguide Award
2020: Won Best Movie for Families for "The LEGO Movie 2: The Second Part" (2019) (with Trisha Gum).

Filmography

Director

Animator

Voice roles

Other credits

Television
The Itsy Bitsy Spider (TV) (1993)
Cartoon Sushi (TV) (1998)
Greg the Bunny (TV) (2002)
SpongeBob SquarePants (TV) (2005–2007) (live action director, storyboard director and writer)
The Loop (TV) (2007)
Trolls: The Beat Goes On! (TV) (2018–) (based on characters created by)
The Barbarian and the Troll (TV) (2021)

Critical reception

References

External links 

 

1970 births
American animated film directors
American film directors
California Institute of the Arts alumni
Living people
Artists from Oklahoma City
DreamWorks Animation people
American storyboard artists